Hunter's Creek is a master planned, unincorporated community and census-designated place in Orange County, Florida, United States. It is part of the Orlando–Kissimmee–Sanford, Florida Metropolitan Statistical Area. The population was 14,321 at the 2010 census. It has grown up around a large planned community named Hunter's Creek, though the CDP name given by the United States Census Bureau lacks the apostrophe.

History
Genstar Development Company based out of Canada owned a massive tract of land in south Orange County Florida totaling up to 3,840 acres. Planning of the upscale community began as early as 1984 with an official kick-off construction announcement in 1986, noting that this was a 15- to 20-year project. Genstar sold much of the remaining development in 1987 for $25,832,000 to American Newland Associates, a California general partnership. August 1997 AG Land Associates, LLC (f/k/a American Newland Associates) sells some of the undeveloped acreages to Westbrook Hunter's Creek, LP for $42,589,200. The majority of the community was built in the late 1980s and 1990s, and some of the community is still under construction.

Geography
Hunter's Creek is located at  (28.357105, -81.428453).

Demographics

As of the census of 2000, there were 9,369 people, 3,460 households, and 2,498 families residing in the CDP.  The population density was 841.3/km2 (2,176.5/mi2).  There were 3,870 housing units at an average density of 347.5/km2 (899.0/mi2).  The racial makeup of the CDP was 81.84% White, 5.18% African American, 0.14% Native American, 7.16% Asian, 0.02% Pacific Islander, 3.02% from other races, and 2.64% from two or more races. Hispanic or Latino of any race were 13.83% of the population.

There were 3,460 households, out of which 37.7% had children under the age of 18 living with them, 62.3% were married couples living together, 6.7% had a female householder with no husband present, and 27.8% were non-families. 19.2% of all households were made up of individuals, and 2.2% had someone living alone who was 65 years of age or older.  The average household size was 2.68 and the average family size was 3.12.

In the CDP, the population was spread out, with 26.2% under the age of 18, 7.0% from 18 to 24, 37.3% from 25 to 44, 23.4% from 45 to 64, and 6.2% who were 65 years of age or older.  The median age was 35 years. For every 100 females, there were 97.7 males.  For every 100 females age 18 and over, there were 95.3 males.

The median income for a household in the CDP was $67,775, and the median income for a family was $76,323. Males had a median income of $51,625 versus $35,625 for females. The per capita income for the CDP was $29,170.  About 3.2% of families and 4.2% of the population were below the poverty line, including 3.8% of those under age 18 and 3.3% of those age 65 or over.

Education

Elementary schools
Hunter's Creek Elementary School
Endeavor Elementary School
West Creek Elementary School
John Young Elementary School

Junior high (secondary, middle) schools
Hunter's Creek Middle School
Freedom Middle School

High schools
Freedom High School

Charter schools
Renaissance Charter School at Hunters Creek

Neighborhoods
There are 38 single family home neighborhoods in Hunters Creek. They are:

Ashton  
Braddock Oaks
Calabay Cove
Carrington 
Casa Vista
Chalfont
Chartres Gardens
Chelsea Landing
Cypress Pointe
Devlin Green
Eagles Landing
Fairways 
Falcon Pointe 
Flora Vista 
Foxhaven
Glenhurst
Heather Glen
Hunter's Isle
Keaton's Crest   
Mallard Cove   
Mar Vista 
Montara 
Ocita    
Orista Bay  
Pace's Mill     
Palma Vista 
The Pointe
Quail Lake
Raintree
Sandhill Trace
Settlers Landing
Sierra Vista   
Tanglewood
Terra Vista    
Timucua Village  
Vida Vista
Villanova at Hunters Creek
Westshire       

There are ten multi family home neighborhoods in Hunters Creek. They are:

Arium Hunter's Creek (formerly Cottages at Hunters Creek)
Audubon Villas
Camden Hunters Creek
Capri at Hunters Creek
Colonial Grand at Heather Glen
Golfview at Hunters Creek
The Parks at Hunters Creek 
The Parkway at Hunters Creek
Urbana
Villanova

Media
Life in Hunter's Creek - A magazine serving the community

References

External links
Hunter's Creek Community Association
Hunter's Creek Golf Course

Unincorporated communities in Orange County, Florida
Census-designated places in Orange County, Florida
Greater Orlando
Census-designated places in Florida
Unincorporated communities in Florida
Planned communities in Florida